is a former Japanese actor.

Career
In 2010, Maeyama was a finalist in the D-Boys special unit audition. He eventually joined the group's D2 division in December 2010.

In 2011, he made his acting debut as Nakazaike Chōji in the Nintama Rantarō musical.

Maeyama's agency announced his hiatus on January 5, 2022. As a result of his hiatus, he was recast in The Thousand Musketeers and the Japanese production of Piaf. On June 30, 2022, Maeyama's agency announced that he had resigned from the company and retired from the entertainment industry to focus on his physical and mental health.

Personal life

Maeyama was in a relationship with actress Sayaka Kanda after the two co-starred in the stage adaptation of Crest of the Royal Family in August 2021. The two had planned to marry, and Maeyama was placed under psychiatric care after her death in December 2021. On January 6, 2022, Shūkan Bunshun published allegations that he had been verbally abusive to her during their relationship.

Filmography

Television
Kamen Rider Wizard (2013) - Sora Takigawa/Gremlin

Film
Kamen Rider Wizard in Magic Land (2013) - Sora Takigawa/Gremlin
Bow Then Kiss (2017) - Igarashi

Theater
Nintama Rantarō (musical) (2011, 2012) - Nakazaike Chōji
VisuaLive: Persona 4 (2012) - Yosuke Hanamura
Ensemble Stars!! On Stage (2018) - Eichi Tenshouin
Hypnosis Mic: Division Rap Battle: Rule the Stage -Track 2- (2020) - Gentaro Yumeno
A Sign of Affection (2021) - Itsuomi

References

External links
 Official profile (Japanese)
 Official blog (October 2013 - )
 Previous blog

1991 births
Living people
21st-century Japanese male actors